The Flying Archaeologist is a British television programme that aired on BBC Four on the 29 April 2013, presented by archaeologist Ben Robinson.

History
The show had previously been aired on BBC One in early April 2013, however it was previously shown as a single episode for each area they were relevant to in a slot after The One Show.

The premise of the show was that Dr Ben Robinson would use aerial archaeology to show how humanity has had an effect on the landscape and offer answers towards British history.

List of Episodes

References

External links
 

2013 British television series debuts
2013 British television series endings
2010s British documentary television series
BBC television documentaries about history
English-language television shows
Archaeology of the United Kingdom